The Best of Pigface Preaching to the Perverted is a two-disc greatest hits album by Pigface, released in 2001.

Track listing

References

2001 greatest hits albums
Pigface albums